Smikle is a surname. Notable people with this surname include:

 Brian Smikle (born 1985), English footballer
 Gary Smikle (born 1966), Jamaican boxer
 Traves Smikle (born 1992), Jamaican athlete